Colin McRae Rally 3 is a racing video game developed and published by Codemasters for Xbox, PlayStation 2 and Microsoft Windows. It features rally cars from the 2002 World Rally Championship.

Reception

Colin McRae Rally 3 received "generally favorable reviews", according to review aggregator Metacritic.

IGN and GameSpot wrote positively of the game, praising improvements made in the handling, sense of speed, collision system, graphics, sound, and car customization over its predecessor, while criticizing its lack of substantial content.

References

External links
 

2002 video games
Cancelled GameCube games
Codemasters games
Colin McRae Rally and Dirt series
PlayStation 2 games
Racing simulators
Rally racing video games
Split-screen multiplayer games
Windows games
Xbox games
Video games set in Sweden
Video games set in Japan
Video games set in Finland
Video games set in Spain
Video games set in Australia
Video games set in Greece
Video games set in the United Kingdom
Video games set in the United States
Video games developed in the United Kingdom